This is a list of songs by the folk music composer and performer Slavko Avsenik (1929–2015). Avsenik wrote around 1000 songs altogether, in Slovene and German.

List
 Aljažev stolp (Aljaž Tower)
 Bele lilije (White Lilies)
 Breze v vetru (Birches in the Wind)
 Casanova
 Cvetlični valček (The Flower Waltz)
 Cvetoče tulpe (The Flowering Tulips)
 Cvetoči lokvanj (The Flowering Water Lily)
 Čakala bom (I Will Wait)
 Čar Julijskih alp (The Charm of the Julian Alps)
 Če prideš nazaj (If You Come Back)
 Če te Gorenjc povabi (If an Upper Carniolan Invites You)
 Če te Gorenjc povabi in malo mešano (If an Upper Carniolan Invites You and a Little Mixed)
 Če vinček govori (If the Dear Wine Talks)
 Če zunaj dežuje (If It Rains Outside)
 Čevapčiči in ražnjiči in dobra kaplica (Čevapčiči and Grilled Skewers and Good Wine)
 Čez korensko sedlo (Over the Koren Saddle)
 Čez Ljubelj (Over the Ljubelj Pass)
 Čujte me, čujte, mamca vi (Hear Me, Hear, You Mummy)
 Dedek mraz prihaja (Grandfather Frost Comes)
 Dedek pridi na ples (Grandpa Come to the Dance)
 Dilce se lomijo (The Planks Break)
 Dišeče rože (The Fragrant Flowers)
 Dobro jutro striček Janez (Good Morning Uncle John)
 Dolge so noči (Long Are the Nights)
 Domače veselje (The Home Joy)
 Dopust se bliža (The Holiday Is Coming)
 Drija drajsom polka (Drija Drajsom Polka)
 Družinski praznik (The Family Feast)
 Drvarska polka (The Lumberjack Polka)
 Ej, takšni smo vsi (Hey, We're All Like That)
 En, dva in tri (One, Two and Three)
 Enkrat ja, enkrat ne (Once Yes, Once No)
 Enkrat levo, dvakrat desno (Once Left, Two Times Right)
 Enkrat na leto praznujem (Once a Year I Celebrate)
 Fant s kitaro (The Boy with the Guitar)
 Fantje, zdaj pa domov (Fellows, Let's Go Home Now)
 Fantovsko veselje (The Boy's Joy)
 Franc vseved (Franc the Know-All)
 Gasilec Franc (The Firefighter Franc)
 Godrnanje in meketanje (Growling and Bleating)
 Gor pa dol (Up and Down)
 Gozdarjeva povest (The Lumberjack's Story)
 Gozdovi v mesečini (Forests in the Moonshine)
 Gremo na Gorenjsko (Let's go to Upper Carniola)
 Gremo na ples (Let's Go to the Dance)
 Gremo na Pokljuko (Let's Go to Pokljuka)
 Ha, ha, Košir se še ne da (Ha, ha, Košir Doesn't Yet Give Up)
 Harmonika in orglice (The Accordion and the Harmonica)
 Hodil po gozdu sem (I Walked Through the Forest)
 Holadri holadra
 Hopla-hopla polka (Hopla–Hopla Polka)
 Hribovski valček (The Hill Waltz)
 Igral sem na orglice (I Played the Harmonica)
 Ivanka
 Iz Bohinja (From Bohinj)
 Iz Hotemaž v Tupal´če (From Hotemaže to Tupal´če)
 Iz naših krajev (From Our Places)
 Izlet na deželo (The Trip to the Country)
 Izlet na Jamnik (The Trip to Jamnik)
 Izlet v Istro (The Trip to Istria)
 Jadraj z menoj (Sail with Me)
 Jadranje nad Gorenjsko (Sailing Above Upper Carniola)
 Jaz pa pojdem k ljub'ci v vas (I Go to Court My Sweatheart)
 Jaz sem pa en Franc Košir (I Am One Franc Košir)
 Je že 35 let (It Is Already 35 Years)
 Je že pač tako (It Just Is So)
 Jej, jej, k'mam težko glavo (My, O, May, My Head Is So Heavy)
 Jesenska polka (The Autumn Polka)
 Jubilejna koračnica (The Jubilee March)
 Juhej, zavriskaj in zapoj (Juhey, Shout and Sing)
 Jurčki in lisičke (Porcinis and Chanterelles)
 Jutranja zarja (The Morning Dawn)
 Jutranjica na obzorju (The Morning Star on the Horizon)
 Jutro na deželi (The Morning in the Country)
 Južek in Marta (Južek and Marta)
 Kadar bom vandral (When I Will Bum Around)
 Kadar grem na Rodne (When I Go to Rodne)
 Kadar na rajžo se podam (When I go to a Travel)
 Kadar pridem na planinco (When I Come to the Little Pasture)
 Kaj da rečem (What to Say)
 Kaj pa reče mamca moja (What Does My Mummy Say)
 Kako bi jo spoznal (How to Meet Her)
 Kakor je tud' res (As It Is Also True)
 Kam tako hitiš (Where Do You Hurry So Much)
 Kje je sreča (Where Is Happiness)
 Klemenčkova (The Klemenček Polka)
 Klic domovine (The Call of the Homeland)
 Klic z gora (The Call from the Mountains)
 Kmalu spet nasvidenje (Goodbye Soon)
 Kmetič praznuje (The Little Farmer Celebrates)
 Ko bom k vojakom šel (When I Go to the Army)
 Ko boš tod mimo šel (When You Go Hereby)
 Ko lovec na štoru je spal (When the Hunter Slept on a Stump)
 Ko mesec sveti (When the Moon Shines)
 Ko se zjutraj prebudim (When I Wake up in the Morning)
 Koledniška polka (The Carol Singer Polka)
 Komedijanti prihajajo (The Comedians Come)
 Koračnica Julijskih Alp (The Julian Alps March)
 Koroška polka (The Carinthia Polka)
 Kraguljčki na saneh (The Sleigh Bells)
 Krivci mojega klobuka (My Hat's Brims) 
 Križi in težave (Worries and Problems)
 Lahovška polka (The Italian Polka)
 Le kdo ve (Just Who Knows)
 Le vrni se (Just Come Back)
 Leo je zaljubljen (Leo Is in Love)
 Lep spomin, ljubica (Nice Memory, My Dear)
 Lepe ste ve Karavanke (You're Beautiful the Karawanks)
 Lepo je biti muzikant (It Is Nice to Be a Musician)
 Lepo je s teboj (It Is Nice to Be with You)
 Lisička in Marička (The Little Fox and Little Mary)
 Ljubezen in hrepenenje (The Love and the Longing)
 Ljubici v slovo (To the Dear in Goodbye)
 Ljubljanska noč (The Ljubljana Night)
 Lov na polhe (The Doormouse Hunt)
 Lovci prihajajo (The Hunters Come)
 Lovska koračnica (The Hunter's March)
 Lovska trofeja (The Hunting Trophy)
 Luštna kelnarca (The Spiffy Waitress)
 Lutka (The Doll)
 Majski valček (The May Waltz)
 Mavrica čez Gorenjsko (The Rainbow Over Upper Carniola)
 Med rojaki v Ameriki (Among the Compatriots in America)
 Melodija za tebe (The Melody for You)
 Mi ne gremo na drugi planet (We Won't Go to Another Planet)
 Mini-polka (The Mini–Polka)
 Miss Kaktus (Miss Cactus)
 Moj Floki (My Floki [a dog])
 Moj hobi (My Hobby)
 Moj očka ima konjička dva (My Daddy Has Two Little Horses) 
 Moj rodni kraj, moj rodni dom (My Birth Place, My Birth Home)
 Moja zlata Mišika (My Golden Mišika)
 Moje sanje (My Dreams)
 Moji tašči (To My Mother-in-Law)
 Na avtocesti (Auf der Autobahn) (On the Highway)
 Na deželi (In the Country)
 Na festivalu (At the Festival)
 Na Golici (Trompeten Echo) (On Golica)
 Na Golici, na pomoč (On Golica, Help!)
 Na Gorjušah (In Gorjuše)
 Na Jezerskem (In Jezersko)
 Na Kranjskem sejmu (At the Kranj Fair)
 Na Krki sem ribce lovil (I Fished in the Krka)
 Na Krvavcu (On Krvavec)
 Na lovski veselici (On the Hunter's Fete)
 Na Martinovo (On St. Martin's Day)
 Na Menini planini (On the Menina Pasture)
 Na mostu (On the Bridge)
 Na oknu slonim (I Lean on the Window)
 Na planinski magistrali (On the Mountain Main Road)
 Na podeželju (In the Country)
 Na podstrešju (In the Attic)
 Na Poljški planini (At Poljška Pasture)
 Na promenadi (At the Promenade)
 Na Robleku (On Roblek)
 Na sejmu (At the Fair)
 Na smučarskem tečaju (At the Ski Course)
 Na svidenje (Goodbye)
 Na Šmarno goro (To Mount Saint Mary)
 Na tebe pa požvižgam se (I Don't Give a Hoot About You)
 Na valovih Jadrana (On the Waves of the Adriatic Sea)
 Na vrtu mojega očeta (In the Garden of My Father)
 Na Zbiljskem jezeru (At Lake Zbilje)
 Na zdravje vsem (Cheers to All)
 Na zdravje vsem (Cheers to All)
 Na Zelenici (At Zelenica [pasture])
 Nabrala bom šopek cvetja (I Will Pick up a Bouquet of Flowers)
 Najin tango (Our Tango)
 Najina zvezda (Our Star)
 Najlepše je doma (It Is Most Beatuful at Home)
 Najlepši cvet (The Most Beautiful Flower)
 Narodna noša (The National Costume)
 Naš pozdrav (Our Greeting)
 Naša žlahta (Our Relatives)
 Našim znancem (To Our Acquaintances)
 Ne maraj za težave (Do not Care About Problems)
 Ne pozabi me (Don't Forget Me)
 Ne sveti zvezda v noč svetleje (The Star Doesn't Shine into the Night Brighter)
 Nedeljski izlet (The Sunday Trip)
 Nemirna mlada leta (The Restless Young Years)
 Nepozabni dnevi (Unforgettable Days)
 Neprespane noči (Sleepless Nights)
 Nežno šepetenje (The Gentle Whisper)
 Ni važno od kod si doma (It Doesn't Matter Where You Are from)
 Nikar domov (On no Account Go Home)
 Nobena ni lepša kot moja (None is more Beautiful than Mine)
 Nobena žavba ne pomaga več (No Salve Doesn't Help Anymore)
 Noč diši po pravljici (The Night Smells of a Fairytale)
 Novoletni koledar (The New Year Calendar)
 Novoletno voščilo: Zvezde na nebu žare (The New Year's Wish: The Stars Glow in the Sky)
 O, moj dragi (Oh, My Dear One)
 O, sveti Florjan (Oh, Saint Florian)
 Ob Dravi (At the Drava)
 Ob jezeru (At the Lake)
 Ob Ljubljanici (At the Ljubljanica)
 Ob slapu (At the Waterfall)
 Obisk na Koroškem (The Visit in Carinthia)
 Obisk v Lipici (The Visit in Lipica)
 Od Ljubljane do Maribora (From Ljubljana to Maribor)
 Odmev s Triglava (The Echo from Triglav)
 Oh ta žeja (Oh, this Thirst)
 Ohcet na Borlu (The Wedding at Borl [castle])
 Okajeni godci (The Tipsy Musicians)
 Okoli novega leta (Around the New Year)
 Oleandrov cvet (The Oleander Flower)
 Opravljivke (The Gossipmongers)
 Otoček sredi jezera (The Little Island in the Middle of the Lake)
 Otroške želje (The Child's Wishes)
 Pa se sliš (And It is Heard)
 Paradna polka (The Parade Polka)
 Pastirček (The Little Shepherd)
 Pesem o divjem petelinu (The Capercaille Poem)
 Pesem v spomin (The Poem to the Memory)
 Pijem rad in dobro jem (I Like to Drink and Eat Well)
 Pisani travniki (The Colourful Meadows)
 Planica, Planica
 Planinski cvet (The Mountain Flower)
 Planinski valček (The Mountain Waltz)
 Ples kurentov (The Kurent Dance)
 Po cvetličnih tratah (Across the Flower Meadows)
 Po cvetočih planinah (Across the Flowering Mountains)
 Po klančku gor, po klančku dol (Up the Little Slope, Down the Little Slope)
 Po trgatvi (After the Grape Harvest)
 Počitnice na kmetih (Holidays on the Farm)
 Pod cvetočimi kostanji (Under the Flowering Chestnuts)
 Pod Dobrčo (Below Dobrča)
 Pod lipco (Under the Little Lime Tree)
 Pod ljubljanskim gradom (Below Ljubljana Castle)
 Pod Špikom (Below Špik)
 Pod Vitrancem (Below Vitranc)
 Pod zvezdnatim nebom (Under the Starry Sky)
 Pogled v dolino (View into the Valley)
 Pogled z Jalovca (View from Jalovec)
 Pohorski valček (The Pohorje Waltz)
 Pojdi z menoj na planino (Go with Me to the Pasture)
 Pokal - polka (The Cup – The Polka)
 Poleti, pozimi (In the Winter, in the Summer)
 Polka na Voglu (The Vogel Polka)
 Polka ostane polka (A Polka Remains a Polka)
 Polka za harmoniko (The Accordion Polka)
 Polka za klarinet (The Clarinet Polka)
 Polnočni zvonovi (The Midnight Bells)
 Pomladi je lepo (It Is Beautiful in the Spring)
 Pomladni nasmeh (The Spring Smile)
 Ponočnjaki (The Night Owls)
 Popolna zmeda (The Complete Mess)
 Posedam rad pred hišico (I Like to Sit in Front of my House)
 Poskočni klarineti (The Lively Clarinets)
 Potepanje s harmoniko (The Wandering with the Accordion)
 Povej mi, kje pomlad gostuje (Tell me Where the Spring Guests)
 Pozdrav iz Kranjske gore (The Greeting from Kranjska Gora)
 Pozdrav s Pohorja (The Greeting from Pohorje)
 Pozdrav s trobento (The Greeting with a Trumpet)
 Pozdrav Selški dolini (The Greeting to the Selca Valley)
 Pozno jeseni (In the Late Autumn)
 Praktično je le kolo (Only a Bicycle is Practical)
 Prav fletno se imamo (We're Really Groovy)
 Prava ljubezen (The True Love)
 Praznik Gorenjske (The Upper Carniola Feast)
 Praznik na vasi (The Village Feast)
 Praznik pršuta in terana (The Prosciutto and Terano Feast)
 Prehitro mimo je mladost (The Youth Passes too Quickly)
 Prekmurska polka (The Prekmurje Polka)
 Prelep je svet (The Magnificent World)
 Prelepa Gorenjska (The Magnificent Upper Carniola)
 Prelepa zelena Begunjščica (The Magnificent Green Begunjščica)
 Prelepi gorenjski cvet (The Magnificent Mountain Flower)
 Prelepi zimski čas (The Magnificent Winter Time)
 Premišljevanje (The Contemplation)
 Pri Jožovcu (At Jožovc's)
 Pri Matuču (At Matuč's)
 Pri nas doma (At Our Home)
 Pri sankaški koči (At the Sled Rider's Lodge)
 Pri sedmerih jezerih (At the Seven Lakes)
 Pri Valvazorjevi koči (At Valvasor Lodge)
 Prijateljem harmonike (To the Friends of the Accordion)
 Prijatelji, ostanimo prijatelji (Friends, Let Stay Friends)
 Proti jutru (Towards the Morning)
 Prvi sončni žarek (The First Sunray)
 Pustni valček (The Shrovetide Waltz)
 Pustovanje na Gorenjskem (The Shrovetide Celebration in Upper Carniola)
 Radovedni astronavt Franc (The Curious Astronaut Franc)
 Rana ura, huda ura (Early Hour, Angry Hour)
 Resje že cvete (The Heather Is Already in Flower)
 Rezka
 Romanca za kitaro (The Guitar Romance)
 Rosno mladi smo mi junaki bili nekoč (Some Day We the Heroes Were in the First Flush of Youth)
 S čolnom po Ljubljanici (With a Boat on the Ljubljanica)
 S harmoniko v hribe (With the Accordion to the Hills)
 S kitaro po svetu (With the Guitar Across the World)
 S kočijo v Bodešče (With a Carriage to Bodešče)
 S pesmijo našo (With Our Song)
 S polko v novo leto (With a Polka to the New Year)
 S trobento v svet (With the Trumpet into the World)
 Samo enkrat imaš 50 let (You're 50 Only Once)
 Samo enkrat se živi (You Only Live Once)
 Samo še en vrček (Only a Single Jug More)
 Sanjam o domovini (I Dream About my Homeland)
 Sem deklica za vse (I'm A General Dogsbody)
 Sem ter tja (To and Fro)
 Shujševalna kura (The Diet)
 Shujševalna kura, nevaren pivski napotek (The Diet, a Dangerous Drinking Advice)
 Silvestrski večer,  zidarski napotek (The New Year's Eve, the Little Building Advice)
 Sinje morje, bela jadra (The Blue Sea, the White Sails)
 Skozi Tuhinjsko dolino (Through the Tuhinj Valley)
 Slalom polka (The Slalom Polka)
 Slovenija, od kod lepote tvoje (Slovenia, Where Your Beauties Are From)
 Slovenski pozdravi (The Slovene Greetings)
 Spomin (The Memory)
 Stara polka (The Old Polka)
 Tudi ti nekoč boš mamica postala (You Will Become a Mummy One Day Too)
 Veter nosi pesem mojo (The Wind Bears My Song)
 Za konec tedna (For the End of the Week)
 Za kratek čas (Lustig mit Gitare und ) (For the Short Time)
 Zinka, Zefka, Zofka

Avsenik, Slavko
Avsenik, Slavko
German songs